Wocania ichthyoenteri is a Gram-negative, strictly aerobic and rod-shaped bacterium from the genus of Wocania which has been isolated from the intestine of the fish Paralichthys olivaceus.

References

Flavobacteria
Bacteria described in 2013